Jushaq Rural District is a rural district (dehestan) in the Central District of Delijan County, Markazi Province, Iran. At the 2006 census, its population was 1,805, in 614 families. The rural district has 9 villages.

References 

Rural Districts of Markazi Province
Delijan County